Statistics of the 1988 Cameroonian Premier League season.

Overview
Tonnerre Yaoundé won the championship.

References
Cameroon - List of final tables (RSSSF)

Cam
Cam
1
Elite One seasons